Development Growth & Differentiation is a peer-reviewed scientific journal published by Wiley on behalf of the Japanese Society of Developmental Biologists. It was established in 1950 as Embryologia, obtaining its current title in 1969. The editor-in-chief is Masanori Taira (Chuo University). According to the Journal Citation Reports, the journal has a 2020 impact factor of 2.053.

Awards
Since 2017, the journal gives three annual awards. The "Editor-in-Chief Prize" is awarded to the most cited article of the last three years, while the "Wiley Prize" has been awarded to the most downloaded article of the previous year. Since 2011, the "Young Investigator Paper Award" have been awarded to a post-doc or graduate student's first author.

DGD Awards

Editors-in-chief
The following persons are or have been editor-in-chief:

References

External links

 Japanese Society of Developmental Biologists

Publications established in 1950
English-language journals
Developmental biology journals
Wiley (publisher) academic journals